Bayt Natar  is a Syrian village located in the Ayn Halaqim Subdistrict of the Masyaf District in Hama Governorate. According to the Syria Central Bureau of Statistics (CBS), Bayt Natar had a population of 1,304 in the 2004 census. Its inhabitants are predominantly Turkmens.

References 

Populated places in Masyaf District